Dance Lexie Dance is a 1996 short film made in Northern Ireland. The two principal characters are a widower, Lexie, and his daughter, Laura, who live in Derry. Laura becomes keen on Irish stepdance and on joining Riverdance when she grows up. Traditional Irish dancing is practiced by Irish Catholic families. Lexie and his daughter are Protestant, but Lexie relents and encourages his daughter. Self-taught, Laura enters a dance contest across the River Foyle in a Catholic district. The film ends as Laura teaches her father the first steps of the dance.

Ruth Barton writes of the film's structure, "Symbolically, the film illustrates its theme of bridging divides – between father and daughter, Protestant and Catholic traditions, life and death – by the device of the boat Lexie (B. J. Hogg) pilots across the Foyle to and from his job, itself a mixed workplace. Finally, Laura performs in a Féis (dancing competition) in honour of which the boat is decked out in red, white, and blue bunting."

Dance Lexie Dance was nominated in the Best Live Action Short Film category at the 70th Academy Awards.

References

Further reading

Dance Lexie Dance at Northern Ireland Screen's Digital Film Archive

1996 short films
1996 films
British short films
British dance films
Films set in Northern Ireland
1990s British films